The 2010 Fuchs-Silkolene British Supersport Championship season was the 23rd running of the British Supersport Championship. The championship was contested over twelve rounds, beginning on 5 April at Brands Hatch, and finishing on 10 October at Oulton Park.

With five victories and ten podiums in total, Sam Lowes added the main championship title to his Supersport Cup triumph of the previous year. Lowes took the title by 33 points ahead of James Westmoreland, with Ben Wilson finishing more than 60 points behind Westmoreland in third place in the championship standings. Two other riders won races during the season; Billy McConnell took back-to-back wins at Cadwell Park and Mallory Park, while Graeme Gowland won at Snetterton. Patrick McDougall won the secondary Privateers' Cup after dropped scores, having been outscored by Jenny Tinmouth before the scores were taken into account.

Calendar
 A provisional calendar had been released on 11 October 2009, with twelve rounds listed, including a provisional date at Donington Park due to renovation of the circuit. Two months later, a revised calendar was released, with Donington Park losing the rights to hold their race on 10–12 September, after Donington Ventures Leisure Ltd was placed into administration. These dates were used for a round at Croft, with a second meeting at Cadwell Park replacing the original Croft date.

Entry List

Championship standings

Riders Championship

Privateers Championship

References

External links
The official website of the British Supersport Championship

British
Supersport
British Supersport Championship